Rakkuyilin Ragasadassil is a 1986 Malayalam-language Indian family drama film written and directed by Priyadarshan, starring Mammootty, Suhasini, Adoor Bhasi, Jagathi Sreekumar and Lissy in lead roles.

Plot

The film starts with the comeback of Mr. Viswanathan, a well-known musician of past. He was in love with his college mate and a dancer Janani. Due to this, the couple faced several problems from her own father and the college principal Ragan Vaidyanathan. But finally they managed to get married. Soon after their marriage, their ego and professional jealousy starts causing problems in their life.  After a very short married life, Viswanathan leaves the house with their son. During his comeback, their son meets Janani. Janani was trying to achieve the Natyasree award in dance.  Viswanathan comes back to prevent this achievement. He challenges Janani to dance to his voice. On the day of competition, Viswanathan realizes the situation and withdraws from the competition. He entrusts his son to sing instead of him. After the award, the couple rejoins.

Cast
Mammootty as Viswanathan
Suhasini as Janani, Viswanathan's love interest
Adoor Bhasi as Ragan Vaidyanathan
Jagathy Sreekumar
Lissy
K. B. Ganesh Kumar
Cochin Haneefa
Sukumari
Sankaradi

Soundtrack
The music was composed by M. G. Radhakrishnan and the lyrics were written by S. Ramesan Nair.

References

External links 
 

1986 films
1980s Malayalam-language films
Films shot in Ooty
Films directed by Priyadarshan
Films scored by M. G. Radhakrishnan